Banaras is a 2009 Indian Malayalam-language masala film directed by Nemom Pushparaj, starring Vineeth, Kavya Madhavan and Navya Nair in lead roles. Sanjay Padiyoor was the production controller.

Plot 
Hari, a village boy and a student is the central character of the movie. He is in love with Devu. He wants to go to Varanasi to do his higher studies in Banaras Hindu University. He leaves behind his love and goes for his studies. There, he meets another fellow student Amritha. Her stepfather wants to marry her off to a street goon and so she asks Hari to take her to a distant place on the bike. During the trip, they take shelter in a tent organized by an old man. The old man gives them bhang to drink and both of them drinks it without knowing the consequences. They both get intoxicated and unknowingly ends up having unprotected sex multiple times during the night. The next day they both are spotted by the goons engaged by her stepfather who injure Hari badly and take Amritha with them.
 
After a few months, Hari recovers and returns to his hometown. He sells off his property and confesses to Devu that he cannot accept and explains to her what happened. In desperation, Devu commits suicide. Hari goes back to Varanasi and lives a sober life. After a long time, Amritha, who was under the impression that Hari is dead, finds out about him and comes back to see him. She had given birth to Hari's son and he is a big boy now. The couple unite.

Cast

Soundtrack

The film's soundtrack features seven songs composed by M. Jayachandran and lyrics penned by Gireesh Puthenchery, except where noted. The soundtrack was noted especially for the vocals of Shreya Ghoshal in two songs. She won the Kerala State Film Award for Best Singer for the track "Chanthu Thottille", first ever by a North Indian singer.

 Track listing

Reception 

Unni R Nair from Indian Express wrote "Despite all these, there are things that go against the film - it doesn't offer anything spectacular and hence may not attract you to the theatres. And since it is released along with the bigger movies, it may not fare too well at the box-office." Paresh C Palicha from Rediff.com wrote" Banaras could have been a worthwhile experience if it was treated with the seriousness it deserved." Sify.com wrote" The film is at best, is a wasted opportunity. The careless approach and lack of passion ruin its chances, though there are some nice aspects like the music, costumes and a talented cast."

Awards
 Kerala State Film Award for Best Female Playback Singer - Shreya Ghoshal for Chanthu Thottille
 Asianet Film Awards - Best Actress for Kavya Madhavan

References

External links 
 

2009 films
2000s Malayalam-language films
2009 romantic drama films
Indian romantic drama films
2000s masala films